The OFC Women's Nations Cup (previously known as the OFC Women's Championship) is a women's association football tournament for national teams who belong to the Oceania Football Confederation (OFC). It was held every three years from 1983 to 1989. Currently, the tournament is held at irregular intervals.

This is a list of records and statistics of the tournament.

General statistics by tournament

Most tournaments hosted

Participating nations

Teams reaching the top four 

Notes
</onlyinclude>

All-time table

Debut of teams

Results of host nations

Results of defending champions

External links
 OFC official website

Records
International women's association football competition records and statistics